The Vancouver Warriors are a professional lacrosse team based in Vancouver, British Columbia. The team plays in the National Lacrosse League (NLL). The 2023 season will be the 23nd in franchise history and the 9th season in Vancouver. The franchise previously played in Everett, Washington, San Jose, and Albany, New York.

Troy Cordingley has taken over the head coaching position this season after the Warriors went 6-12 under Chris Gill, whose contract was not renewed.

Regular season

Final standings

Game log

Roster
Reference:

Entry Draft
The 2022 NLL Entry Draft took place on September 10, 2022.

The Vancouver Warriors selected:

References

Vancouver
Vancouver Warriors seasons